Internet challenges are a genre of videos in which users record themselves performing an action, usually daring others to repeat it. They play a role in Internet meme culture, with many challenges spreading through such memes. Examples include the ALS Ice Bucket challenge, which went viral in mid-2014, and the TrashTag Challenge, which went viral in 2019.

Internet challenges are similar to the common children's dare game in which they dare each other to perform an action that one would not normally do.

Some challenges/tasks predate the Internet; some periodically resurface in a somewhat different form. The popularity of internet challenges is explained by people's, especially teenagers', need to seek attention and be liked. Many of these challenges can be dangerous.

Controversy 
There has been controversy around Internet challenges due to the harmful nature of some. Many Internet challenges such as the Cinnamon challenge or the Tide Pod challenge has proven to be extremely harmful and even fatal in some cases.

Internet challenges such as these have been disallowed on Youtube, so most people deciding to create a challenge usually post on other platforms such as TikTok, where creating Internet challenges like these is not moderated as strictly.

Other challenges tend to be rude or disrespectful, such as the Gallon Smashing Internet challenge.

List of challenges

References 

Challenges